Gabriel Fernández may refer to:

 Gabriel Fernández (basketball) (born 1976), Argentine basketball player
 Gabriel Fernández (footballer, born 1977), Argentine midfielder
 Gabriel Fernández (footballer, born 1992), Argentine defender
 Gabriel Fernández (footballer, born 1994), Uruguayan forward
 Gabi (footballer, born 1983), Spanish footballer
 Gabriel Fernández Ledesma (1900–1983), Mexican painter
 Gabriel Fernández Álvez (1943–2008), Spanish composer
 Vicentico (Gabriel Julio Fernández Capello, born 1964), Argentinian musician and composer
 Gabriel Fernández (singer) (born 1968), Venezuelan singer and actor
 Gabriel Fernandez (2005–2013), American boy who was tortured and murdered
 The Trials of Gabriel Fernandez, a 2020 documentary produced by Netflix about the murder

See also
 Gabriel Fernandes (born 1988), Indian association footballer